Netball Jamaica is the peak governing body for the sport of netball in Jamaica. The organisation's stated objectives for Jamaica netball are to achieve national and international success in competition, encourage greater participation and spectator involvement, and ensure excellence in all spheres of the sport. The senior Jamaican netball team is known as the Sunshine Girls, while the Jamaican Fast 5 netball team is known as Jamaica Fast5 or the FAST5 Girls.

Incorporation
In 2013, Netball Jamaica became the trading name for The Netball Foundation of Jamaica, a registered company and an approved charitable organisation. This new entity superseded the Jamaica Netball Association (JNA), which was founded in 1958, and brings with it fundamental changes to how the sport is administered going forward. As a part of the change, NJ will now have a maximum of three 2-year term limits for its presidents effective 2015. Before, presidents could serve up to ten years. The organization had been unincorporated for the last 50 years, but it now has been registered as a charitable company. The status of a charitable organization also meant sponsors and donors would receive tax relief for cash and in-kind donations that are treated as an allowable charitable expense under Section 13(1)(q) of the Jamaica Income Tax Act.

Organizational structure
The Foundation is governed by a Board of Directors of ten (10) persons with the authority to co-opt additional directors as it sees fit. The board meets twelve (12) times per year on the second Saturday of each month. Directors are not allowed to serve for more than three terms of two years each, for a total of six years. At the end of the 6-year term, if not before, the director will have to resign from service. As of July 6, 2013, the parish associations are now considered member associations of Netball Jamaica. This was keeping in line with the other major international netball associations around the world. Aside from promoting the sport of netball, Netball Jamaica is responsible for determining rules and policies within Jamaica, and organizing competition on behalf of the country.

Tricia Robinson is the current President of the Netball Jamaica Board. Former Jamaica national squash player, Karen Anderson, was appointed General Manager of Netball Jamaica in May 2013.

Commitment to Charity
As a charitable organization, Netball Jamaica actively seeks to work with community groups, educational institutions, sporting clubs, youth organizations, charities and charities, to build their capacity in developing women and children through the sport of netball. Community outreach & development, economic empowerment and personal advancement, particularly in the poorest communities of Jamaica, are some of the major focuses of Netball Jamaica.

Grassroots Programmes
Jamaica has many netball leagues ranging from high school to their highest level, the semi-professional Elite League. An initiative was also launched in 2014, for 'Pickney Netball', which involves teaching netball to basic school children, aged between 3–6 years, with a ‘goal’ to enjoy the game while learning skills that enhance their overall development.

Presidents

See also
Netball in Jamaica
Notable past players
Jamaican netball players
Most-capped Jamaican netballers

References

External links

Jamaica
Sports governing bodies in Jamaica
Netball in Jamaica
Sports organizations established in 1958
Jam